Mui tsai, which means "little sister" in Cantonese, describes young Chinese women who worked as domestic servants in China, or in brothels or affluent Chinese households in traditional Chinese society. The young women were typically from poor families, and sold at a young age, under the condition that they be freed through marriage when older. These arrangements were generally looked upon as charitable and a form of adoption, as the young women would be provided for better as mui tsai than they would if they remained with their family. However, the absence of contracts in these arrangements meant that many mui tsai were resold into prostitution. According to some scholars, many of these girls ended up as either concubines or prostitutes, while others write that their status was higher than a concubine's.

In traditional Chinese culture, a family needs a male offspring. Poor parents, who were unable to support many children, sometimes killed newborn infants if they were female. In consideration of the grinding poverty it was an accepted alternative to sell unwanted girls.

The practice was also prevalent before World War II in Hong Kong, Singapore and parts of Southeast Asia.

Hong Kong
During the middle of the 19th century the British Slavery Abolition Act and the Slave Trade Act were enacted. The Hong Kong government did not impose any restriction on the transfer of girls as mui tsais before 1923, because this was treated as a family matter or traditional custom. Kathleen Simon, Viscountess Simon, fought for several decades to free the remaining mui tsai.

In 1922 after press campaigns in Britain and support from MPs including John Ward in the House of Commons, Winston Churchill, the Secretary of State for the Colonies, pledged that the mui tsai system in Hong Kong would be abolished within one year. Under pressure from the British Parliament, the Hong Kong Legislative Council enacted the Female Domestic Service Bill the next year. Further importations and transfers of mui tsais were prohibited. The demand for registration of all mui tsais, however, was postponed. The new law was never seriously observed.

In 1926, Britain became one of the signatories to the International Slavery Convention under the League of Nations. The mui tsai issue soon came under international scrutiny. Facing strong political pressure, the Hong Kong government enacted the Female Domestic Service Ordinance in 1923. All mui tsais had to be registered prior to 31 May 1930. Afterwards no registration and thus no sale was allowed. Inspectors were appointed to pay visits to the mui tsais to ensure that they were not ill-treated and had had their wages paid.

The latest case was reported in 2005. Chinese parents received a financial relief for their daughter who was transferred to Hong Kong. She worked incessantly from dawn to dusk. After physical tortures she was admitted to the hospital.

Macau
In the 16th century it was a common practice in Macau for poor families to sell daughters as domestic servants for 40 years. As the Portuguese settled in Macau they began to establish brothels with mui tsais, but the Mandarins intervened.

United States
In the 19th century a large number of Chinese workers immigrated to the United States. The Chinese Exclusion Act of 1882 prevented Chinese men of the working class from sending for wives from China nor did the law permit them to marry non-Chinese wives in some states. Now many Chinese girls and young women immigrated with false papers showing them to be the wives or daughters of the privileged class. Most of them arrived at Angel Island in the San Francisco Bay. The girls were sold for household servants. As they got older, they were frequently sold into prostitution. Mui tsais became a target for Protestant reformers in San Francisco. The Presbyterian Mission House in San Francisco's Chinatown rescued Chinese girls and women from abusive circumstances.

Despite the work of reformers in the United States, the mui tsai system continued into the early 20th century.

See also
 Anti-Mui Tsai Activism
 Anti-Mui Tsai Society
 Chinese American history

References

Citations

Sources

External links
 
 
 

Cantonese words and phrases
Concubinage
Chinese-American history
Domestic work
History of Hong Kong
History of San Francisco
Social history of China
Slavery in China
History of women in California